Chris Terry (born April 7, 1989) is a Canadian professional ice hockey player who is currently playing with the Bridgeport Islanders in the American Hockey League (AHL). He was drafted 132nd overall by the Carolina Hurricanes during the 2007 NHL Entry Draft.

Playing career

Junior
Terry was drafted by the Plymouth Whalers in the second round, 29th overall in the 2005 OHL Draft from the Markham Islanders. In his rookie season as a 16-year-old with the Whalers, Terry recorded 28 points in 64 games, followed by five points in 11 games in the playoffs during the 2005–06 season.

Terry's production increased to 66 points in 68 games with Plymouth in 2006–07 season, finishing with the third highest point total on the team. Terry followed that up with 18 points in 20 post-season games, helping the Whalers win the J. Ross Robertson Cup, and a berth to the 2007 Memorial Cup. Plymouth would lose to the eventual champion Vancouver Giants in the semi-finals. After the season, Terry was drafted by the Carolina Hurricanes in the 2007 NHL Entry Draft.

During the 2007–08 season, the Whalers named Terry as their captain during road games. Terry would enjoy a breakout season, finishing sixth in the OHL with 44 goals and 101 points. He then led the Whalers in playoff scoring, earning seven points in four games.

Terry was named the Whalers full-time captain in the 2008–09 season, and he continued putting up impressive offensive numbers, finishing second in league scoring with 94 points in 53 games. In 11 playoff games, Terry finished with 16 points, tied for the team lead. After the season, Terry was awarded the Mickey Renaud Captain's Trophy and the Dan Snyder Memorial Trophy by the league.

In 253 career games with the Whalers, Terry finished with 289 points, third highest in team history.

Professional

After his junior team was eliminated in the playoffs in 2008, the Carolina Hurricanes assigned Terry on an amateur try-out contract to their AHL affiliate, the Albany River Rats at the end of the 2007–08 season. He made his professional debut and in one game went pointless for the Rats. Following another year with the Whalers, Terry was signed by the Hurricanes to a three-year entry level contract on May 29, 2009.

After attending the Hurricanes training camp, Terry returned to Albany for his first full professional season in the 2009–10. Terry remained in the AHL, until the 2012–13 season, when he was recalled and made his NHL debut on March 9 against the New Jersey Devils at PNC Arena.  He recorded his first NHL goal and point in his debut.

After the 2015–16 season, having completed his first full season in the NHL, Terry left the Hurricanes as a free agent after seven seasons with the club. On July 2, 2016, Terry was signed to a one-year, two-way deal with the Montreal Canadiens.

Terry had a memorable 2017–18 season, despite spending it in the AHL. Near the beginning of the season, Terry was named an alternate captain along with Matt Taormina. He was named to the AHL All-Star Classic and earned AHL player of the month in March. At the conclusion of the 2017–18 season, Terry was named to the AHL First All-Star team. He was also recognized as the Laval Rockets AHL Man of the Year for his charity and community involvement. Terry was later awarded the AHL Leading Scorer title after finishing the season with a career-high 71 points.

On July 1, 2018, Terry signed as a free agent to a two-year, two-way contract with the Detroit Red Wings.

At the conclusion of his contract with the Red Wings, having played exclusively with AHL affiliate, the Grand Rapids Griffins, Terry left the club as a free agent. With the 2020–21 North American season delayed due to the COVID-19 pandemic, and approaching his 12th professional season, Terry opted to sign his first contract abroad, agreeing to a one-year contract for the remainder of the season with Russian outfit Torpedo Nizhny Novgorod of the Kontinental Hockey League (KHL) on December 8, 2020. Terry made 19 regular season appearances with Torpedo, registering 8 goals and 8 assists for 16 points.

Following a first-round exit in the post-season, Terry returned to North America as a free agent and was signed to a one-year AHL contract with the Bridgeport Islanders, affiliate to the New York Islanders on August 3, 2021.

International play
Terry represents Canada internationally in inline hockey.

Charity involvement
In 2018, Terry launched the "Chris ALS All-star" program. As part of this program, Terry awarded two people living with ALS tickets to a Laval Rockets home game and a personal meet-and-greet.

Career statistics

Regular season and playoffs

International

Awards and honours

References

External links

1989 births
Living people
Albany River Rats players
Bridgeport Islanders players
Canadian ice hockey left wingers
Carolina Hurricanes draft picks
Carolina Hurricanes players
Charlotte Checkers (2010–) players
Grand Rapids Griffins players
Ice hockey people from Ontario
Inline hockey players
Laval Rocket players
Montreal Canadiens players
Plymouth Whalers players
St. John's IceCaps players
Sportspeople from Brampton
Torpedo Nizhny Novgorod players